Milnesium swolenskyi is a species of tardigrade from the Cretaceous period. It, Beorn and Paradoryphoribius are the only known tardigrade genera in the fossil record. The type specimen AMNH NJ-796 was found in Turonian New Jersey amber, from about 93.9 to 89.8 million years ago (mya).

References

Literature
 Guidetti R, Bertolani R (2005) Tardigrade taxonomy: an updated check list of the taxa and a list of characters for their identification. Zootaxa 845: 1-46
 Penney D. Biodiversity of Fossils in Amber from the Major World Deposits, Siri Scientific Press, 2010 - 304 pp.

Fossil taxa described in 2000
Apochela